IκBα (nuclear factor of kappa light polypeptide gene enhancer in B-cells inhibitor, alpha) is one member of a family of cellular proteins that function to inhibit the NF-κB transcription factor.  IκBα inhibits NF-κB by masking the nuclear localization signals (NLS) of NF-κB proteins and keeping them sequestered in an inactive state in the cytoplasm.  In addition, IκBα blocks the ability of NF-κB transcription factors to bind to DNA, which is required for NF-κB's proper functioning.

Disease linkage
The gene encoding the IκBα protein is mutated in some Hodgkin's lymphoma cells; such mutations inactivate the IκBα protein, thus causing NF-κB to be chronically active in the lymphoma tumor cells and this activity contributes to the malignant state of these tumor cells.

Interactions

IκBα has been shown to interact with:

 BTRC, 
 C22orf25,
 CHUK, 
 DYNLL1, 
 G3BP2, 
 Heterogeneous nuclear ribonucleoprotein A1, 
 IKK2, 
 NFKB1, 
 P53, 
 RELA, 
 RPS6KA1, 
 SUMO4,  and
 Valosin-containing protein.

References

Further reading

External links 
  OMIM entries on Ectodermal Dysplasia, Anhidrotic, with T-cell Immunodeficiency
 
 
 

Transcription factors